Authaemon is a genus of moths in the family Geometridae.

Species
 Authaemon poliophara Turner, 1919
 Authaemon purpurea Goldfinch, 1944
 Authaemon stenonipha Turner, 1919

References
 Authaemon at Markku Savela's Lepidoptera and Some Other Life Forms

Nacophorini
Geometridae genera